Oregon Township is one of nine townships in Starke County, Indiana. As of the 2010 census, its population was 3,367 and it contained 1,718 housing units.

Geography

Cities, towns, villages
 Hamlet (east half)
 Koontz Lake (vast majority)

Unincorporated towns
 Grovertown at 
(This list is based on USGS data and may include former settlements.)

Adjacent townships
 Johnson Township, LaPorte County (north)
 Lincoln Township, St. Joseph County (northeast)
 Polk Township, Marshall County (east)
 West Township, Marshall County (southeast)
 Washington Township (south)
 Center Township (southwest)
 Davis Township (west)
 Union Township, LaPorte County (northwest)

Cemeteries
The township contains Fletcher Cemetery.

Major highways

School districts
 Oregon-Davis School Corporation

Political districts
 Indiana's 2nd congressional district
 State House District 17
 State Senate District 5

References

External links
 Indiana Township Association
 United Township Association of Indiana
 United States Census Bureau 2008 TIGER/Line Shapefiles
 United States Board on Geographic Names (GNIS)
 IndianaMap

Townships in Starke County, Indiana
Townships in Indiana